Germantas Telsiai was an ice hockey team in Telsiai, Lithuania. They played in the Lithuania Hockey League from 1992 to 1998.

History
The club struggled at first, finishing in last place during their first two seasons in the Lithuania Hockey League. They finished in second place to SC Energija in 1994-95. In 1995-96, they finished first in the regular season, but lost to SC Energija in the playoff finals. Telsiai finished in second place in 1996–97, but lost the third place game to Nemunas Rokiskis. Their last appearance in the Lithuania Hockey League came during the 1997-98 season, where they finished in last place in the league after only winning one game.

Season-by-season results

References

External links
Team profile on eurohockey.com

Ice hockey teams in Lithuania